Richard William Thon (born June 20, 1958) is a Puerto Rican-American former professional baseball shortstop who played in Major League Baseball (MLB) for the California Angels, Houston Astros, San Diego Padres, Philadelphia Phillies, Texas Rangers, and Milwaukee Brewers, during the course of his 15-year big league career.

Early life 
Thon was raised in Puerto Rico after spending only the first two weeks of his life in Indiana where his father had just completed a bachelor's degree at the University of Notre Dame.

Professional career 
He was signed by the California Angels as an amateur free agent on November 23, 1975, while in high school in Río Piedras, Puerto Rico. During his 15-year career, Thon spent two seasons with the Angels (1979–1980), seven seasons with the Houston Astros (1981–1987), one season with the San Diego Padres (1988), three seasons with the Philadelphia Phillies (1989–1991), one season with the Texas Rangers (1992), and finished his career with the Milwaukee Brewers (1993). He led the National League in triples in 1982 and was selected to the 1983 All-Star Game.

Potential and beaning 
By 1984, Thon was drawing excitement about his potential. "He's already the best shortstop in the league," said Craig Reynolds, whom Thon had replaced as the Astro shortstop. Al Rosen, Thon's general manager, said, "when I see Dickie Thon, I see a future Hall of Famer." His career was permanently altered on April 8, 1984, when he was hit in the face by Mike Torrez's fastball. Bill James thinks Thon might have been a Hall of Famer had the injury not occurred. The pitch broke the orbital bone around his left eye and ended his 1984 season. He returned in 1985, but had problems with depth perception that permanently hampered his potential. In 1991, Thon received the Tony Conigliaro Award in recognition of his recovery from this severe injury.

In 2013, Thon said, "I couldn't see the ball very well after I got hit in my left eye. I had to make adjustments, and open up a little bit and see the ball better. It's tough to do that in the big leagues, but I did manage to play 10 [more] years." He viewed the injury as just one bad moment in a life filled mostly with blessings: "I've had a lot of good things happen to me. I try to think about it that way."

Personal life 
Thon is a third-generation baseball player. He is the grandson of Freddie Thon Sr., a native Puerto Rican who played and managed in the Puerto Rican Baseball League during World War II. His father Freddie Thon Jr., who signed a major-league contract but injured his arm before reporting to training, played semi-pro baseball while finishing college at Notre Dame, and coached all of his sons throughout their Little League and teenage years. Dickie's brother Frankie Thon is also affiliated with major league baseball in both the U.S. and Puerto Rico having been a player, a manager and a current major-league scout, as well as the general manager of the Criollos de Caguas in the Puerto Rican League.

Thon's son, Dickie Joe Thon, was selected by the Toronto Blue Jays in the 5th round, 156th overall in the June 2010 baseball draft and played the 2016 season for the Dunedin Blue Jays.  Thon joined the Astros coaching staff in 2021, and in 2022, the junior Thon was named manager for the Fayetteville Woodpeckers, the Low-A club for the Astros.   

Thon was inducted into the Hispanic Heritage Baseball Museum Hall of Fame on September 13, 2003.

As of 2013, Thon owned a Puerto Rican Winter League team in Santurce. He is a devout Catholic.

See also

 Hispanic Heritage Baseball Museum
 Houston Astros award winners and league leaders
 List of Major League Baseball annual triples leaders
 List of Major League Baseball players from Puerto Rico
 List of Puerto Ricans
 List of second-generation Major League Baseball players#Third-generation families

References

External links

Prospectus Hit and RunI Saw 'em When, Part 2, article by Jay Jaffe

1958 births
Baseball players from South Bend, Indiana
California Angels players
Houston Astros players
Living people
Major League Baseball players from Puerto Rico
Major League Baseball shortstops
Milwaukee Brewers players
National League All-Stars
Philadelphia Phillies players
Puerto Rican baseball players
Salinas Angels players
Salt Lake City Gulls players
San Diego Padres players
Quad Cities Angels players
Texas Rangers players
Tucson Toros players
Silver Slugger Award winners
Sportspeople with a vision impairment
Puerto Rican Roman Catholics
Catholics from Indiana